Mitteleuropa is an album by the Jazz Marca (Roberto Magris / Lilli Furlan / Franco Polisseni Trio), with the addition of a horn section, guitar, vibes and percussion, released in 1986 on the Gulliver label and reissued in 2006 by the English label Arision.

Reception

The Basic Soul review by Andy Allen simply states: "Here pianist Roberto Magris extends his usual trio to accommodate a horn section giving the compositions a much fuller sound than that found on their Comunicazione Sonora album, which is most effective on the immaculate Dedalus."

Track listing
 Città Di Frontiera (Roberto Magris) - 12:06 
 Dedalus (Roberto Magris) - 8:15 
 Annamaria (Roberto Magris) - 1:36 
 Three Dorico Time (B. Vatta – arr. R. Magris) - 7:33 
 Blues Transfert (Roberto Magris) - 13:21

Personnel

Musicians
Roberto Magris - piano
 Lilli Furlan - bass
 Franco Polisseni - drums
 Andrea Sottani - trumpet
 Sergio Campagnolo - alto sax
 Ettore Martin - tenor sax
 Tiziano Strata - baritone sax
 Roberto Cocever - guitar
 Saverio Tasca - vibraphone and percussion

References

Jazz albums
1986 albums